Stegocoleus is an extinct genus of ommatine beetle. Its distinctive morphology includes a distinctive flat rim on the outer edge of the elytra similar to those of Burmocoleus and Jarzembowskiops, but is distinguished from those genera by a distinctive prothorax. It is known from 3 species found in Cenomanian aged Burmese amber.

References  

Burmese amber
Ommatidae
Prehistoric beetle genera